Sir Harry Whitlohn was a spoof character who appeared as a "castaway" on the BBC Radio programme Desert Island Discs and was interviewed as though he were real, by the presenter Roy Plomley, on 1 April 1963 - April Fools' Day.

Whitlohn was variously presented as a "man of affairs, musician, mountaineer, and mystic", an "88-year-old mountaineer, mystic and spy" and "the only man living who had collaborated with Brahms".

In reviewing the book "Desert Island Discs: 70 Years of Castaways" by Sean Magee for The Guardian in 2012, Stephen Moss wrote:

The role of Whitlohn was played by the actor Henry Sherek, himself a former castaway on the programme. The character was originally to be called "Harry Whitlow".

References 

April Fools' Day
1963 in radio
BBC Radio
April 1963 events in the United Kingdom